Toxidia doubledayi, the Doubleday's skipper or lilac grass-skipper, is a butterfly of the family Hesperiidae. It is found in the mountains and on the coastal plain of the east coast of Australia, including New South Wales and Queensland.

The wingspan is about 30 mm. 

The larvae feed on Oplismenus species. They construct a shelter made from a curled leaf held with silk. It rests in this shelter during the day.

External links
Australian Insects
Australian Faunal Directory

Trapezitinae
Butterflies described in 1862